Formosia is a genus of parasitic flies in the family Tachinidae.

Species

Formosia atribasis (Walker, 1861)
Formosia blattina (Enderlein, 1936)
Formosia bracteata (Enderlein, 1936)
Formosia callipygos Gerstaecker, 1860
Formosia complicita (Walker, 1861)
Formosia engeli (Enderlein, 1936)
Formosia eos (Enderlein, 1936)
Formosia excelsa (Walker, 1862)
Formosia faceta (Enderlein, 1936)
Formosia fervens (Walker, 1861)
Formosia flavipennis (Macquart, 1848)
Formosia fusca Crosskey, 1973
Formosia gemmata (Enderlein, 1936)
Formosia glorificans (Walker, 1861)
Formosia heinrichiana (Enderlein, 1936)
Formosia heinrothi (Enderlein, 1936)
Formosia mirabilis (Guerin-Meneville, 1831)
Formosia moneta Gerstaecker, 1860
Formosia paupera Meijere, 1904
Formosia saturatissima (Walker, 1861)
Formosia smaragdina Malloch, 1929
Formosia solomonicola Baranov, 1936
Formosia speciosa (Erichson, 1842)
Formosia viridiventris Crosskey, 1973

References

Diptera of Australasia
Diptera of Asia
Tachinidae genera
Dexiinae
Taxa named by Jean-Baptiste Robineau-Desvoidy